Noqreh Deh (also known as Nakordedi, Noghreh Deh, Noqar Deh, and Nowkhowrdeh) is a village in Kiashahr Rural District, Kiashahr District, Astaneh-ye Ashrafiyeh County, Gilan Province, Iran. At the 2006 census, its population was 1,046, in 288 families.

References 

Populated places in Astaneh-ye Ashrafiyeh County